1965 in philosophy

Events

Publications 
 Paul Ricœur, Freud and Philosophy: An Essay on Interpretation (1965)
 Gordon E. Moore, Cramming more components onto integrated circuits (1965)

Philosophical fiction 
 Pierre Klossowski, The Baphomet (1965)
 Frank Herbert, Dune (1965)

Births

Deaths 
 February 21 - Malcolm X (born 1925)
 June 13 - Martin Buber (born 1878)
 August 11 - Erich Rothacker (born 1888)
 September 4 - Albert Schweitzer (born 1875)
 October 22 - Paul Tillich (born 1886)

References 

Philosophy
20th-century philosophy
Philosophy by year